is an action-adventure video game spin-off of the popular Golden Axe series. The game was released on the Sega Game Gear in 1991.

The protagonist is Ax Battler, the male barbarian character from the original Golden Axe game. The series' primary villain, Death Adder, is laying siege to the entire world. He steals the Golden Axe, a magical weapon that grants its wielder unimaginable power, from its hiding place in Firewood Castle. To prevent Death Adder using its powers to destroy the world, the king of Firewood Castle calls upon the help of his strongest warrior: Ax Battler. During his journey, Ax Battler must battle through the following 'special landmarks': The Spooky Cave, Peninsula Tower, Turtle's Back, Death Pyramid, Evil Cave, Maze Wood, Gayn Mountain, Eagle's Back, Ice Cliffs and Death Adder's Castle.

Gameplay
Unlike the original side-scrolling beat 'em up Golden Axe games, Ax Battler is divided into three different sections of gameplay: –

 Map scene' This mode shows the player's movements in a top-view overworld as he moves across the wilderness. Enemies randomly attack, prompting the game to switch to the below Action Screen.
 Town scene: Similar in appearance to the Map Scenes, except this mode shows the player's actions in a town. The core difference is the ability to talk to NPCs and visit stores.
 Action screen: The game switches to Action Screen when the player encounters an enemy or enters one of the special landmarks. This is a side-scrolling beat 'em up/platform environment.

Ax Battler can collect magic vases, which can be used for his magical attacks or as currency in the towns. He can also learn new attacks in the Training Houses.

Passwords can be collected from the towns to serve as a 'saving' system.

Reception

The game is noted due to its similarities to Zelda II: Adventure of Link. Zero wrote that Ax Battler successfully expanded on the premise of the original games and called it a "surefire winner", rating it an 87%. However, Mean Machines called the beat'em up aspect of the game "extremely poor" and called the quest "dull and uninspiring." Rating the game a 39%, they compared playing Ax Battler to jumping off a cliff – writing "one go is more than enough, and isn't really recommended at all."

Notes

References

1991 video games
1992 video games
Action-adventure games
Fantasy video games
Game Gear games
Game Gear-only games
Sega video games
Video games set in castles
Golden Axe
Video games developed in Japan